The M-10000 was an early American streamlined passenger trainset that operated for the Union Pacific Railroad from 1934 until 1941.  It was the first streamlined passenger train to be delivered in the United States, and the second to enter regular service after the Pioneer Zephyr of the Chicago, Burlington and Quincy Railroad.

Development

The M-10000 car design built upon the efforts of William Bushnell Stout, an early designer of all-metal airplanes, who adapted fuselage design ideas to the Railplane (not to be confused with the Bennie Railplane), a lightweight self-propelled railcar built by Pullman-Standard in 1932.  The tapered car cross-section, lightweight tubular aluminum space frame construction, and Duralumin skin of the Railplane were carried over into the M-10000 design.  The performance of the Railplane in testing drew the attention of Union Pacific, who sought the services of Pullman-Standard in building a small, lightweight streamlined trainset for mainline service.   Union Pacific ordered M-10000 from Pullman in May 1933 at a cost of $230,997, following an analysis of passenger traffic that concluded new, more cost effective equipment than heavyweight passenger cars and steam locomotives was required for maintaining profitability, especially on low-traffic routes.  The streamlined body was developed from a series of wind tunnel tests that were carried out at the University of Michigan.     

The Electro-Motive Corporation (EMC) developed the internal combustion-electric propulsion system powered by a 600 hp spark-ignition engine.  As was their practice as a system engineering firm at the time, they contracted manufacture of the components of their systems to primary equipment manufacturers.  General Motors' Cleveland subsidiary, the  Winton Engine Corporation, provided the prime mover.  The air brake compressor, main generator, traction motors and control equipment were manufactured by the General Electric Company.  Skepticism that development efforts for diesel engines underway in the early 1930s would provide timely release of an engine adequate for high speed rail service led to  use of a spark-ignition distillate engine.  Trucks were strongly influenced by German passenger bogie design, as investigated by Union Pacific chief engineer A.H. Fetters.

Design

The M-10000 was a three-car trainset, with a combined power/baggage/railway post office car and two trailing passenger coaches. The trainset was articulated using shared Jacobs bogies to reduce weight, making the train operate as one integrated unit rather than as a separable locomotive and cars. 

The power car featured an elevated "turret cab" behind a nose featuring a large vertically-divided air intake grille formed by parabolic arches. On the roof of the cab were a headlamp and a vertical marker light.  The train was powered by a single  spark-ignited distillate-burning engine built by the General Motors subsidiary Winton Engine Corporation driving a generator that powered two traction motors on the leading truck of the power car.  The two passenger coaches each had a capacity of 60 people; the last coach also included a small galley at the rear end to prepare meals that were served at passengers' seats.  Original livery consisted of Armour Yellow sides with a Leaf Brown nose, roof, rear, and lower panels, with red striping separating the two main colors.  The nose was subsequently painted Armour Yellow consistent with other early Union Pacific streamliners.

Service history

The trainset was delivered on February 12, 1934, and was sent on a publicity tour across the US, during which about a million people toured it and its stops became local media sensations.  During its  exhibition tour across the US as The Streamliner, where it hit a top speed of 110 mph (177 km/h) during its journey, it visited Washington DC for inspection by Franklin Delano Roosevelt. The popular train was put on display at the 1934 World's Fair ("A Century of Progress") in Chicago from May 26 to October 31, 1934.  It was somewhat overshadowed by the other lightweight streamliner, the diesel-powered Burlington Zephyr, which entered the fair after a record-setting "Dawn to Dusk Dash" speed run from Denver to Chicago, in time to arrive at the "Wings of a Century" transportation pageant. During its testing, demonstration, and display periods, the M-10000 trainset included the sleeper car Overland Trail, which was removed from the consist prior to revenue service and added to Union Pacific's next streamliner, M-10001.

M-10000 was placed in revenue service between Kansas City, Missouri and Salina, Kansas as The Streamliner on January 31, 1935. It was subsequently named City of Salina as Union Pacific adopted the "City of..." convention for its new streamliners, but was also nicknamed the "Tin Worm" or "Little Zip".  It operated until December 1941, by which time its engine, after powering the train for approximately 995,000 miles, required replacement that was deemed prohibitively expensive.  The trainset was scrapped the following year, with its aluminum recycled for use in the wartime aircraft industry.

Legacy
Union Pacific commissioned five diesel-powered streamliners during 1934–1936, evolved from the M-10000 design.  The color scheme originated with M-10000 was used for UP's later streamliners, and changed incrementally to the Armour Yellow and Harbor Mist Gray livery that became UP's standard.  The "Streamliner" name for M-10000 became the general term for locomotives and passenger trains styled with clean lines and an aerodynamic look.  The high-mounted, behind-the-nose cab design originated with M-10000 was later adopted for EMC's E-Series and F-Series locomotives, although without the front-mounted air intake.  Integrated-body-and-frame, or carbody, designs became standard for rail equipment where weight was a concern, such as early mainline diesel locomotives, passenger cars, urban mass transit rail, and high speed passenger rail.

In popular culture 

In the 1937 children's book "Choo Choo: The Story Of An Engine Who Ran Away" by Virginia Lee Burton, an M-10000 is cast as the streamliner train that helps Choo Choo's crew pursue the title engine after she runs away.  Once Choo Choo is found on an old unused track, her engineer, Jim, uses a chain to help the streamliner tow Choo Choo back to the big city as the M-10000 lacks couplers.

References

Footnotes

Bibliography

External links

 "The Iron Horse Goes Modern" Popular Mechanics, September 1933 -- detailed article on Union Pacific engineering research that lead to the M-10000
 "Tuning Up A Streamliner" Popular Mechanics, November 1935 pp. 718-719 improvements resulting in the M-10001
 , contemporary description of the train

North American streamliner trains
Diesel multiple units of the United States
Articulated passenger trains
Union Pacific Railroad locomotives
Scrapped locomotives